Ioannou or Joannou is a Greek surname, derived from the given name John.

Notable people with surname Ioannou or Joannou:

People

Ioannou
Demetris Ioannou (born 1968), Cypriot footballer
Dimitrios Ioannou (1861-1926), Greek general
Dimitris Ioannou (born 1977), Greek footballer
Eleni Ioannou (1984-2004), Greek judo athlete
Fifis Ioannou (1914-1988), 2nd Secretary General of AKEL
Giorgos Ioannou (1926-2017), Greek painter
John Ioannou, Greek-Canadian actor
Kyriakos Ioannou (born 1984), Cypriot high jumper
Memos Ioannou (born 1958), Greek basketball player
Nicolas George Ioannou (born 1965), Cypriot businessman
Orthodoxos Ioannou (born 1986), Cypriot footballer
Susan Ioannou (born 1944), Canadian poet
Yiannos Ioannou (born 1966), Cypriot footballer

Joannou
Chris Joannou (born 1979), bass player 
Dakis Joannou (born 1939), Cypriot industrialist
Stelios Joannou (1915-1999), Cypriot philanthropist

See also 
Joannou & Paraskevaides, Middle East contractor

Greek-language surnames
Surnames
Patronymic surnames
Surnames from given names